Lawrence Emmett Regan (August 9, 1930 – March 9, 2009), was a Canadian professional ice hockey player and hockey executive. He played for the Boston Bruins and Toronto Maple Leafs after a long senior-hockey career, winning the Allan Cup in 1948. He later managed and coached the Los Angeles Kings of the NHL and was president of the NHL Alumni Association.

Playing career
Regan moved to Ottawa as a youth. As a 16-year-old, he joined the Ottawa Jr. Senators organization in 1945-46. Regan then played for the Ottawa Senators in the Quebec Senior Hockey League. He moved to Toronto to play two seasons with the Toronto Marlboros organization, first as a junior, then at the senior level. He returned to the Senators in 1950, playing two seasons before joining the Shawinigan Cataracts. Regan then moved on to the Pembroke Lumber Kings of the Northern Ontario Hockey Association and the Quebec Aces of the Quebec Hockey League.

In 1956-57, Larry finally got his chance in the National Hockey League with the Boston Bruins as a 27-year-old. He scored 14 goals that season, which would be his career high, and he won the Calder Memorial Trophy, the oldest player to win it at that time (Sergei Makarov won it when he was 31 years old in 1988-89 with the Calgary Flames). He played two and a half seasons with the Bruins before being claimed on waivers, for $15,000 on January 7, 1959, by the Toronto Maple Leafs. He played two further seasons with the Leafs before being demoted to the Pittsburgh Hornets in the American Hockey League. In 1962, he moved to Innsbruck, Austria, coaching the Innsbrucker EV for two seasons before returning to the AHL with the Baltimore Clippers in 1965-66 for one final season.

Hockey executive career
While still playing, Regan became a playing-coach in 1961–62 with the Pittsburgh Hornets for part of the season. He was named to coach the Etobicoke Indians of the Ontario Hockey Association in 1966, but left the position to join Jack Kent Cooke, owner of the expansion Los Angeles Kings, as head scout, and later Regan was promoted to general manager. Regan was also the head coach for the 1970-71 and part of the 1971-72 seasons and he remained in the job until 1973.

"I knew Jack from the years I played in Toronto. We became pretty good friends along the way and stayed in touch. When I heard about the NHL expanding, I put my oar in the water with Jack before anybody else and I was fortunate enough to be chosen."

As coach, Regan was once fined US$1,000 by NHL president Clarence Campbell for punching referee Bruce Hood in the face following a game in Oakland, California, California in 1968. He was upset after a late penalty cost the Kings a victory against the California Seals. Regan was quoted as saying "Someone had to do something with officiating like that." More than 10,000 attended the next Kings' game.

After his time with the Los Angeles Kings, he moved to Montreal where he coached the Montreal Juniors in the 1974–75 season, quitting after the one season.

NHL Alumni Association and Alan Eagleson inquiry 
After leaving the Montreal Juniors, Regan became involved in the National Hockey League Alumni Association (NHLAA), an association of retired NHL ice hockey players, eventually becoming the head of the organization. In the 1980s, former NHL stars such as Gordie Howe and Bobby Orr noticed that they were not being paid to the full amount that they should have been paid for their pensions. An investigation by a Boston-area reporter named Russ Conway led to Alan Eagleson being indicted and convicted on fraud and was sentenced to prison. Regan was head of the NHLAA at the time  and he participated in the investigation, contacting any player involved with Eagleson.

Post NHL life 
Regan retired soon after the Eagleson inquiry and he lived in Ottawa, Ontario with his wife Pauline until his death in 2009. He had Parkinson's disease prior to his death.

Awards and achievements
Calder Memorial Trophy winner in 1957.

Career statistics

Coaching record

References

External links
 

1930 births
2009 deaths
Baltimore Clippers players
Boston Bruins players
Calder Trophy winners
Canadian ice hockey coaches
Canadian ice hockey forwards
Ice hockey people from Ottawa
Los Angeles Kings coaches
Los Angeles Kings executives
Los Angeles Kings scouts
Pittsburgh Hornets players
Sportspeople from North Bay, Ontario
Toronto Maple Leafs players
Toronto Marlboros players